John La Touche is the name of:

John La Touche (1732–1810), Irish MP
John La Touche (1775–1820), Irish and UK Whig MP
John David Digues La Touche (1861–1935), Irish ornithologist
John La Touche (lyricist) (1917–1956), American musical theater librettist